The Stephen Fowler Hale House, also known as the Hale-Jarvis-Trotter House, is a historic structure in Eutaw, Alabama.  The house was added to the Alabama Register of Landmarks and Heritage on November 30, 1977, and subsequently placed on the National Register of Historic Places on April 2, 1982, due to its architectural significance.  It is a part of the Antebellum Homes in Eutaw Thematic Resource.

References

National Register of Historic Places in Greene County, Alabama
Houses on the National Register of Historic Places in Alabama
Houses completed in 1842
Properties on the Alabama Register of Landmarks and Heritage
Houses in Greene County, Alabama